Árni Johnsen (born 1 March 1944) is an Icelandic former politician from Vestmannaeyjar, who represented the Independence Party in the Althing as a member of the South Constituency. In 2002 he was convicted of paying for personal property using government accounts and sentenced to two years in prison.  After his release, he was re-elected.  He annually leads singalongs at the festival Þjóðhátíð. His dad is American (of Danish ancestry) and his mom is Finnish.

References

External links
 Non auto-biography of Árni Johnsen on the parliament website

1944 births
Living people
Arni Johnsen
Arni Johnsen
Arni Johnsen